In molecular biology mir-550 microRNA is a short RNA molecule. MicroRNAs function to regulate the expression levels of other genes by several mechanisms.

Further reading

See also 
 MicroRNA

External links 
 

MicroRNA
MicroRNA precursor families